Lee de Broux (born May 7, 1941)  is an American character actor of film and television who is best known for his roles in such films and television series as Chinatown, RoboCop, The Gun, Geronimo: An American Legend, Norma Rae, Cannon and Gunsmoke.

Filmography

Run, Angel, Run! (1969) - Pappy
Tell Them Willie Boy Is Here (1969) - 'Meathead'
Sometimes a Great Notion (1970) - Willard Eggleston
Wild Rovers (1971) - 'Leaky'
Evel Knievel (1971) - Wrangler #1
The Dirt Gang (1972) - Jesse
Coffy (1973) - Nick
The Outfit (1973) - Walter Kinney (uncredited)
The Nickel Ride (1974) - Harry
The Terminal Man (1974) - Reporter
Chinatown (1974) - Policeman #2
The Klansman (1974) - Reverend Alverson
Hawmps! (1976) - Fitzgerald
The Incredible Hulk (1978-1982) - Mike Evans / Leo
Norma Rae (1979) - Lujan
Back Roads (1981) - 'Red'
Frances (1982) - 'Flowing Gold' Director
Voyager from the Unknown (1982) - Haggerty
Hunter's Blood (1986) - 'Red Beard'
Ratboy (1986) - Catullus Cop
RoboCop (1987) - Sal
Above the Law (1988) - CIA Interrogator
Pumpkinhead (1988) - Tom Harley 
Young Guns II (1990) - Bounty Hunter
Hangfire (1991) - Kuttner
Diplomatic Immunity (1991) - McManus
Conflict of Interest (1993) - Ray Dureen
Geronimo: An American Legend (1993) - City Marshal Joe Hawkins
Steal Big Steal Little (1995) - INS Official
Wild Bill (1995) - Carl Mann
Mars (1997) - Sheriff Bascom
Most Wanted (1997) - Commander Goldstein
The Last Letter (2004) - Mr. Brannigan
The Metrosexual (2007) - Mr. Dawson
Magic (2010) - Park & Ride Security Guard
Killer by Nature (2010) - Medical Examiner
10 Years (2010) - Sheriff Hoss
Kids vs Monsters (2015) - Norman
Senior Love Triangle (2019 film) (2019) - Hank

References

External links

1941 births
Living people
American male film actors
American male television actors
20th-century American male actors
21st-century American male actors